Arnold J. Cane (December 11, 1914 – September 10, 1968) was an American lawyer, jurist, and legislator.

Born in Ontonagon, Michigan, Cane attended to the public schools in Ontonagon. He then received his doctorate and law degrees from Marquette University. He then practiced law in Menasha, Wisconsin. He served on the Menasha Board of Education and as justice of the peace. Cane served in the Wisconsin State Assembly 1951–1959 was a Republican. In 1962, he was elected a Wisconsin Circuit Court judge serving until his death. Four months before he died, he sustained serious injuries in a car accident, when he was struck by a drunk driver. He died in Neenah, Wisconsin of a heart attack.

Notes

1914 births
1968 deaths
People from Ontonagon, Michigan
People from Menasha, Wisconsin
Marquette University alumni
Marquette University Law School alumni
Wisconsin lawyers
Wisconsin state court judges
School board members in Wisconsin
Republican Party members of the Wisconsin State Assembly
20th-century American lawyers
20th-century American judges
20th-century American politicians